The Nokia Eseries consists of business-oriented smartphones running Symbian OS, with emphasis on enhanced connectivity and support for corporate e-mail push services, as well as enterprise-styled products and many featuring QWERTY keyboards. All devices have advanced office features through its S60 platform. Phones equipped with Wireless LAN also provide a VoIP client (SIP Protocol). Throughout the series' lifetime its main competitors were BlackBerry products from Research In Motion. The Eseries was marketed until 2011.

Announcements
On October 12, 2005, mobile phone manufacturer Nokia announced what the company refers to as the Eseries, consisting of the three mobile phones, the Nokia E60, Nokia E61 and Nokia E70.

On May 18, 2006, Nokia announced the addition of the E50 to the series, which it refers to as a "business device" rather than a "smartphone".

On February 12, 2007, Nokia announced the addition of three new devices to the series; E61i, E65 and E90 Communicator.

On April 11, 2008, Nokia Australia has advised that the E61i will be discontinued in May 2008 and be replaced by a more featured but smaller E71. Later releases included E72, E52 and E5.

The last Eseries device was the Nokia E6 from 2011.

See also
 Nokia phone series#List of Eseries devices

References

External links

 Nokia Eseries (Product Portal)
 Detail Information for all Nokia devices
 
 
 
 
 
 
 

Nokia ESeries